György Libik (18 October 1919 – 23 January 1995) was a Hungarian alpine skier. He competed in two events at the 1948 Winter Olympics.

References

1919 births
1995 deaths
Hungarian male alpine skiers
Olympic alpine skiers of Hungary
Alpine skiers at the 1948 Winter Olympics
Sportspeople from Ružomberok
20th-century Hungarian people